Thamer Al-Shamroukh (born 7 May 1977) is a Kuwaiti swimmer. He competed in the men's 200 metre freestyle event at the 1996 Summer Olympics.

References

1977 births
Living people
Kuwaiti male swimmers
Olympic swimmers of Kuwait
Swimmers at the 1996 Summer Olympics
Place of birth missing (living people)
Swimmers at the 1998 Asian Games
Kuwaiti male freestyle swimmers
Asian Games competitors for Kuwait